"Watch Out" is a song by American hip hop recording artist 2 Chainz. It was released on July 22, 2015 as a single from his mixtape, Trap-A-Velli Tre. This track was produced by FKi. The song was later included as an iTunes exclusive track on 2 Chainz' third studio album ColleGrove. The song was certified Platinum by the Recording Industry Association of America (RIAA) October 12, 2016, for selling over 1,000,000 digital copies in the United States.

Music video
A music video was released on January 25, 2016 on 2 Chainz's Vevo account on YouTube. The video features the head of Chainz on different bodies - from a pianist, to a dancing boy, to a toddler, to a couple of guys playing basketball, to President Obama, and many more. It was directed by Motion Family - a trio composed of David Ka, Diwang Valdez and Sebastian Urrea.

Commercial performance
"Watch Out" debuted at number 85 on Billboard Hot 100 for the chart dated January 16, 2016. It later peaked at number 64.

Awards and nominations

Charts

Weekly charts

Year-end charts

Certifications

References

External links

2015 songs
2015 singles
2 Chainz songs
Songs written by 2 Chainz
Def Jam Recordings singles
Songs written by FKi 1st